Northcliffe Peak is a prominent peak, 2,255 m, rising 4 nautical miles (7 km) southeast of Mount Harmsworth in the Worcester Range. Surveyed and named in 1957 by the New Zealand party of the Commonwealth Trans-Antarctic Expedition (1956–58) because of its association with Mount Harmsworth. Sir Alfred Harmsworth, a generous contributor to the Discovery expedition (1901–04), was later created Viscount Northcliff.

Mountains of the Ross Dependency
Hillary Coast